John Fong Yew (born 13 August 1932) is a Trinidad and Tobago sports shooter. He competed in the men's 50 metre rifle, prone event at the 1976 Summer Olympics.

References

1932 births
Living people
Trinidad and Tobago male sport shooters
Olympic shooters of Trinidad and Tobago
Shooters at the 1976 Summer Olympics
Place of birth missing (living people)